Pseudotomoxia kamerunesis is a species of beetle in the genus Pseudotomoxia of the family Mordellidae, which is part of the superfamily Tenebrionoidea. It was described in 1948 By Ermich.

References

Beetles described in 1948
Mordellidae